Shaun Gunn (born 29 June 1998) is a Scottish rugby union player who most recently played for Edinburgh Rugby in the United Rugby Championship. Gunn's primary position is prop.

Rugby Union career

Professional career
Gunn signed for Edinburgh academy in June 2020.

External links
itsrugby Profile

References

1998 births
Living people
Scottish rugby union players
Edinburgh Rugby players
Rugby union props